An epididymal cyst is a cyst of the epididymis containing serous liquid. They are difficult to differentiate from a spermatocele except by aspiration, since a spermatocele contains milky-appearing sperm.

References

Cysts
Epididymis disorders